Lynn D. Salvage is an American banker.

Education 
Salvage graduated from the University of Pennsylvania and the Harvard Business School.

Career 
Salvage became president and CEO of the Katharine Gibbs School in 1980, and resigned in 1981. She was also president of First Women's Bank in New York, which she left in 1980. She also served for seven years as a vice president at Bankers Trust, during which she took a year's leave to serve as a special assistant at the Treasury.

In 1979, the Supersisters trading card set was produced and distributed; one of the cards featured Salvage's name and picture.

References

Year of birth missing (living people)
Living people
American women bankers
American bankers
University of Pennsylvania alumni
Harvard Business School alumni
American women chief executives
21st-century American women